Interivoire, formally known as Societé Ivoirienne de Transport Aerien was an airline of the Ivory Coast.  It was founded in 1978 and ceased operations in 1979.

See also		
 List of defunct airlines of Côte d'Ivoire

References

Airlines established in 1978
Airlines disestablished in 1979
Defunct airlines of Ivory Coast
Companies based in Abidjan
Ivorian companies established in 1978